The Keebler Company is an American cookie and former cracker manufacturer. Founded in 1853, it has produced numerous baked snacks, advertised with the Keebler Elves. Keebler had marketed its brands such as Cheez-It (which have the Sunshine Biscuits brand), Chips Deluxe, Club Crackers, E.L. Fudge Cookies, Famous Amos, Fudge Shoppe Cookies, Murray cookies, Austin, Plantation, Vienna Fingers, Town House Crackers, Wheatables, Sandie's Shortbread, Pizzarias Pizza Chips, Chachos and Zesta Crackers, among others.  The cookie and cracker lines were separated when Kellogg's sold the cookie line and the rights of the Keebler name to Ferrero SpA. The cracker lines are now marketed under the Kellogg's or Sunshine names.
The Keebler slogans are "Uncommonly Good" and "a little elfin magic goes a long way". Tom Shutter and Leo Burnett wrote the familiar jingle. The Kellogg Company sold Keebler to the Italian-owned Ferrero SpA in 2019.

Company history 

Godfrey Keebler, of German descent, opened a bakery in Philadelphia, Pennsylvania, in 1853. His bakery networked with several other local bakeries and others around the country over the years, and in 1927 they merged into the United Biscuit Company of America.

United Biscuit operated regional bakeries which included not only Keebler, but also Hekman Biscuit Company of Grand Rapids, Michigan, the Strietmann Biscuit Company of Mariemont, Ohio and the Bowman Biscuit Company of Denver which used the Supreme brand name. By 1963, United Biscuit introduced the Kitchen Rich brand nationally while still utilizing the regional brand names. In 1966, United Biscuit decided to adopt a uniform brand name and chose Keebler as the national brand and the name of the company. Keebler did adopt Streitmann's Zesta saltine brand as Keebler's national brand of saltine crackers. 

Keebler-Weyl Bakery became the official baker of Girl Scout Cookies in 1936, the first commercial company to bake the cookies (the scouts and their mothers had done it previously). By 1978, four companies were producing the cookies. Little Brownie Bakers is the Keebler division still licensed to produce the cookies.

Keebler was acquired by United Biscuits in 1974, headquartered in West Drayton, Middlesex, England. By the 1980s, Keebler had expanded into the bagged salty snack market, launching a string of successful and innovative snack chips such as Tato Skins, O'Boisies, and Pizzarias. In 1995, United Biscuits announced plans to spin off the snack chip business, but ending up selling the entire company to a partnership between Flowers Industries and Artal Luxembourg, a private equity firm. Artal Luxembourg sold its holdings in Keebler in an IPO in 1998.

The Keebler Company purchased Sunshine Biscuits in 1996. 

In 2000, the Keebler Company acquired a license to produce snacks based on the popular children's show Sesame Street.

In March 2001, The Keebler Company was acquired by the Kellogg Company. At that time, headquarters were located in Elmhurst, Illinois. Currently, Keebler has manufacturing plants in the United States, Thailand, Indonesia, and Malaysia.

On April 1, 2019, Kellogg announced that it was selling Keebler cookies and other related brands to Ferrero SpA for $1.3 billion. The acquisition is a part of Ferrero's strategy to buy brands which have been neglected within broader food companies' portfolios. Kellogg retained the rights to other Keebler products, such as crackers, either under the Kellogg's or Sunshine names. The acquisition closed on July 29, 2019.

Keebler Elves 
The animated Keebler Elves, led by "Ernest J. 'Ernie' Keebler", rank among the best-known characters from commercials. Ernie is the head elf and the friendliest of the bunch. The elves have appeared in countless television advertisements throughout the years, shown baking their unique products. In the commercials, the Keebler tree logo is often turned into the tree in which the elves reside.

Leo Burnett Worldwide, an advertising agency, created the elves in 1968, calling the bakery "The Hollow Tree Factory."

J.J. Keebler was the original "king elf" in 1969, and was featured in a classroom film about how animated commercials are made, "Show and Sell", with J.J.'s voice performed by Alan Reed, Sr. Ernie Keebler became "head elf" in 1970. White-haired Ernie wears a green jacket, a white shirt with a yellow tie, a red vest, and floppy shoes.

Ernie Keebler was first voiced by Walker Edmiston, later by Parley Baer, then Frank Welker in 2007, then Richard Henzel since 2016.

Other elves were Fryer Tuck (who promoted "Munch-ems"), Ernie's nephews Zoot and J.J. (known for Pizzarias Pizza Chips), Ernie's mother Ma Keebler, young Elmer Keebler, Buckets (who threw fudge on the cookies), Fast Eddie (who wrapped the products), Sam (the peanut butter baker), Roger (the jeweler), Doc (the doctor and cookie maker), Zack (the fudge shoppe supervisor), Flo (the accountant), Leonardo (the artist), Elwood (who ran through the dough), Professor, Edison, Larry and Art. Many of the Keebler commercials were narrated by the announcer Danny Dark. The first Keebler elves were drawn by children's author/illustrator and commercial artist Roger Bradfield.

List of Keebler snacks
Examples of Keebler products include:

References

External links 

 

Brand name snack foods
Ferrero SpA brands
Snack food manufacturers of the United States
American companies established in 1853
Food and drink companies established in 1853
Companies based in DuPage County, Illinois
Elmhurst, Illinois
1853 establishments in Pennsylvania
2019 mergers and acquisitions
1998 initial public offerings
Companies formerly listed on the New York Stock Exchange
American subsidiaries of foreign companies